Mitchell Paul Mullany (September 20, 1968 – May 25, 2008) was an American stand-up comedian, actor, screenwriter, and author. Mullany was best known for his portrayal of White Mike in the 1990s comedy sitcom The Wayans Bros and as Nick Freno in the sitcom Nick Freno: Licensed Teacher, which both aired on The WB.

Career
Mullany was born in Concord, California on September 20, 1968. At the age of 19 he began his stand-up career, performing in East Oakland venues. The following year he performed on MTV's 1/2 Hour Comedy Hour, It's Showtime at the Apollo, and An Evening at the Improv. After a minor recurring role as White Mike on the sitcom The Wayans Bros. from 1995 to 1996, he starred in his own series, Nick Freno: Licensed Teacher from 1996 to 1998. Both shows aired on The WB. During his breaks from Nick Freno: Licensed Teacher, he continued to perform his stand-up act around the country. In 1999, he wrote and starred in his first feature film The Breaks as Derrick King. In 2003, he hosted an ABC reality series called All American Girl. He also appeared numerous times on The Tonight Show with Jay Leno.

In 2006, he wrote and published a book titled Stranded at Almost, and started a YouTube channel on January 27, 2007.

Personal life
Mullany spent most of his time between his hometown of Oakland, California and Los Angeles, California.

Death
Mullany died on May 25, 2008, of a diabetes-related stroke.

Filmography

References

External links

1968 births
2008 deaths
Male actors from Oakland, California
American male film actors
American male screenwriters
American stand-up comedians
American male television actors
Writers from Oakland, California
Screenwriters from California
Comedians from California
20th-century American comedians
21st-century American comedians
20th-century American male actors
20th-century American male writers
20th-century American screenwriters